Rue Pierre Charron is a street in the 8th arrondissement of Paris, near Avenue Montaigne high-fashion district.

History
This street was once part of a unique rue de Morny that extended until the Place d'Iéna. Already with its present name, its section between the avenue George V and the abovementioned place was renamed avenue Pierre 1er de Serbie in 1918.

Present name
Pierre Charron (1541–1603) was a French philosopher, author of Traité de la Sagesse (Treatise on Wisdom), and a friend of fellow philosopher Montaigne after whom the nearby avenue Montaigne is named.

Closest Métro station
The Rue Pierre Charron empties into the avenue des Champs-Elysées about midway between métro line 1 stations George V and Franklin D. Roosevelt. Also nearby are metro line 9's Saint-Philippe du Roule (to the north) and Alma-Marceau (to the south).

Other attributions
Mentioned in French singer/songwriter Renaud's "Les Charognards."